Lachanodes is a genus of plants in the groundsel tribe of the sunflower family. The plants are native to certain islands in the South Atlantic (Saint Helena, Ascension, Tristan da Cunha).

 Species
 Lachanodes arborea (Roxb.) B.Nord. 
 Lachanodes cuneifolia DC.
 Lachanodes leucadendron DC.
 Lachanodes pladaroxylon Endl.
 Lachanodes prenanthiflora Burch. ex DC.

References

External links

 Plant Illustrations, Lachanodes prenanthiflora Burch. ex DC.

Senecioneae
Asteraceae genera